California's 7th district may refer to:

 California's 7th congressional district
 California's 7th State Assembly district
 California's 7th State Senate district